Tetracha femoralis is a species of tiger beetle that was described by Perty in 1830, and can be found in Argentina, Brazil, and Paraguay.

References

Beetles described in 1830
Beetles of South America
Cicindelidae